Cyclomactra ovata (previously Mactra ovata) is a trough shell of the family Mactridae.

References

 Miller M & Batt G, Reef and Beach Life of New Zealand, William Collins (New Zealand) Ltd, Auckland, New Zealand 1973
 Powell A. W. B., New Zealand Mollusca, William Collins Publishers Ltd, Auckland, New Zealand 1979 

Mactridae
Bivalves of New Zealand
Bivalves described in 1843